Ruthann Friedman (born July 6, 1944) is an American folk singer-songwriter and guitarist best known for writing the hit song "Windy" for the American sunshine pop band the Association.

Early years
Born in Bronx, New York, Friedman spent her formative years in the San Fernando Valley, north of Los Angeles after her family moved to Southern California when she was 10. She started playing guitar at the age of eight while listening to Woody Guthrie, Pete Seeger and Josh White.

After moving to California, Friedman recalled feeling "very isolated" with few friends, so she started playing guitar in her room. Her first song gained her a spot on the television talent show Rocket to Stardom at age 12. While at Ulysses S. Grant High School, she started playing "Hoot Nights" at The Troubadour in West Hollywood, where she met the musicians Steve Mann and Hoyt Axton and became part of the growing musical scene of Los Angeles.

Career
Her first paid performance was at the Green Spider Coffee House in Denver, Colorado at the age of nineteen. Soon she was part of the "Hippie Migration," traveling the California Coast and living off earnings from her performances. While staying in San Francisco, California, Friedman befriended the members of Jefferson Airplane, Country Joe and Janis Joplin. Her friendship with Van Dyke Parks not only influenced her deep commitment to music but also introduced her to The Association, who recorded her song "Windy" in 1967. Friedman wrote "Windy" in 20 minutes while living in an apartment in David Crosby's house.

In 1968, she was part of the band Petrus, which also included Peter Kaukonen.

Two years later, Constant Companion, her first solo album, was released by Reprise Records. She also wrote and sang the songs for the cult movie The Peace Killers, released in 1971. While on tour promoting the album, Friedman suddenly returned to her family's Los Angeles home after a family tragedy and stopped recording music altogether in 1972–73.

In 2006, Water, a San Francisco label, reissued Constant Companion, renewing interest in Friedman's music. Prior to the 2006 reissue, Friedman had been out of the music business for more than thirty years, spending the intervening time running her own stationery company, raising two daughters and earning a degree in English from UCLA. Later in 2006, Water released a compilation of rare and previously unreleased home recordings from 1965–1971, Hurried Life.

After the re-release of Constant Companion, Friedman was invited to play at a local festival. She recalls that she had "to learn to play [guitar] again" and was taught the songs from her album by a guitarist at a local folk venue, McCabe's Guitar Shop in Santa Monica, but "it took about two years [of practicing] for me to get my chops back."  Friedman has been performing locally in Los Angeles since that time.

Discography

References

External links
 
Ruthann Friedman's facebook website
The New Los Angeles Folk Festival interviews Ruthann Friedman
 
 
 

1944 births
American folk singers
American folk guitarists
American women singer-songwriters
People from the Bronx
Psychedelic rock musicians
Living people
Jewish singers
Jewish American musicians
Singers from New York City
People from the San Fernando Valley
Singer-songwriters from California
Guitarists from California
Guitarists from New York City
American acoustic guitarists
20th-century American guitarists
Grant High School (Los Angeles) alumni
20th-century American women guitarists
21st-century American Jews
Singer-songwriters from New York (state)
21st-century American women